In commutative algebra, the deviations of a local ring R are certain invariants εi(R) that measure how far the ring is from being regular.

Definition

The deviations εn of a local ring R with residue field k are non-negative integers defined in terms of its Poincaré series P(t) by 

 

The zeroth deviation ε0 is the embedding dimension of R (the dimension of its tangent space). The first deviation ε1 vanishes exactly when the ring R is a regular local ring, in which case all the higher deviations also vanish. The second deviation ε2 vanishes exactly when the ring R is a complete intersection ring, in which case all the higher deviations vanish.

References

Commutative algebra